This article is a partial list of the engineering colleges located in the state of Madhya Pradesh, India. The year that the college opened is shown in brackets.

Central Government Institutions
 Indian Institute of Technology, Indore

 Maulana Azad National Institute of Technology, Bhopal (1960)
 Indian Institute of Information Technology and Management, Gwalior
  Indian Institute of Information Technology, Design and Manufacturing, Jabalpur

State Government Autonomous/Aided Institutions

 Jabalpur Engineering College, Jabalpur (1947)
 Shri Govindram Seksaria Institute of Technology and Science, Indore (1952) 
 Madhav Institute of Technology and Science, Gwalior (1957)
 Samrat Ashok Technological Institute, Vidisha (1960) 
 Ujjain Engineering College, Ujjain (1966)
 Rewa Engineering College, Rewa (1964)
 Indira Gandhi Engineering College Sagar (1981)
 Engineering College, Nowgong (2013)
 IPST, Mahatma Gandhi Chitrakoot Gramoday University, Chitrakoot, Satna (1991)

Self-financing
 Barkatullah University Institute of Technology, Bhopal (1997)
 Institute of Engineering and Technology, DAVV, Indore
 Rustamji Institute of Technology, Tekanpur, Gwalior (1999)
 University Institute of Technology, RGPV, Bhopal (1986)
 School of Engineering and Technology, Vikram University, Ujjain (2011)
 University Institute of Technology, RGPV, Shahdol (2015)

Private Engineering Colleges in Madhya Pradesh

 MIT Group of Institutes, Ujjain 
Indore Institute of Science and Technology 
Sagar Institute of Science and Technology (SISTec), Bhopal
Patel Group of Institutions, Bhopal
 Bansal Institute of Science & Technology
 Technocrats Institute of Technology, Bhopal
 Gyan Ganga College of Technology, Jabalpur
 Gyan Ganga Institute of Technology and Sciences, Jabalpur
 Lakshmi Narain College of Technology, Jabalpur
 Lakshmi Narain College of Technology, Bhopal
 Oriental Institute of Science and Technology, Bhopal
 Sagar Institute of Research & Technology, Bhopal
 Hitkarini College of Engineering & Technology, Jabalpur
 Medi-Caps Institute of Technology & Management, Indore
 Shri Vaishnav Institute of Technology and Science, Indore
 AKS University, Satna
 Bhabha Engineering Research Institute, Bhopal
 Institute Of Engineering & Science IPS Academy, Indore
 Truba Group of Institutes, Bhopal
 NRI Group of Institutions, Bhopal
 Lakshmi Narain College of Technology and Science
 Institute of Technology & Management, Gwalior
AMITY UNIVERSITY, GWALIOR
  Jaypee University of engineering and technology ,Guna

References
Parts of this list was obtained from website of Directorate of Technical Education MP Govt, University RGPV Bhopal Website and DTE mponline counselling 2016. 

 
Madhya Pradesh
Engineering colleges